Forts and fortifications in Sri Lanka date back thousands of years with many being built by Sri Lankan Kings, these include several walled cities. With the out set of colonial rule in the Indian Ocean, Sri Lanka was occupied by several major colonial empires that from time-to-time became the dominant power in the Indian Ocean. The colonists built several western styled forts, mostly in and round the coast of the island. The first to build colonial forts in Sri Lanka were the Portuguese, these forts were captured and later expanded by the Dutch. The British occupied these  Dutch forts during the Napoleonic wars.

Most of colonial forts were garrisoned up until the early 20th century. The coastal forts had coastal artillery manned by the Ceylon Garrison Artillery during the two world wars. Most of these were abandoned by the military, but retained civil administrative officers, while others retained military garrisons, which were more administrative than operational. Some were reoccupied by military units with the escalation of the Sri Lankan Civil War, Jaffna fort for example came under siege several times.

Anuradhapura period

Transitional period

Sitawaka forts

Portuguese forts

Kandyan period

Kandyan forts

Dutch forts

British forts

Notes

References

External links 

Dutch and Portuguese buildings in Sri Lanka, written by Marco Ramerini
Colonial Forts in Sri Lanka 
The remnants of Dutch culture in Sri Lanka
Forten en stellingen in Sri Lanka (Ceylon) tijdens de Nederlandse periode 

 
Sri Lanka military-related lists
Lists of buildings and structures in Sri Lanka
Sri Lanka
Lists of tourist attractions in Sri Lanka